The Boyne Island Tannum Sands Golf Club is a sports club with a golf course located in Jacaranda Drive, Boyne Island in the Gladstone Region, Queensland, Australia.  The club has a 13-hole course adjacent to the Boyne River.

History
The club was established in 1982.

Course layout
The course is a Par 72, 5730 meters with 13 holes. Five holes are replayed from different tees to make up the 18 holes.  The course is fairly flat, with sand bunkers and water hazards.  the 12th hole is particularly challenging, with out of bounds and water hazard in strategic locations.

See also

Golf in Australia

References

1982 establishments in Australia
Sports clubs established in 1982
Sports venues completed in 1982
Golf clubs and courses in Queensland
Gladstone Region
Boyne Island, Queensland
Buildings and structures in Central Queensland